''

Sarah Lynn Dawson is an English actress and filmmaker.

Early life

She was born in The Lake District in England. and she spent a large part of her childhood growing up in Qatar, in the Middle East where she started acting at the age of seven when she was cast in a community theatre show. She was in the local theatre companies’ productions and danced ballet and tap. She later attended the University of Leeds, where she received a BA Hons Degree in Sociology. She also holds citizenship in the United Kingdom and the United States.

Career

Sarah studied acting at the Lee Strasberg Theatre and Film Institute in New York on their two year Acting Certificate Program. Whilst in New York she acted in the Off-Broadway show 'Men' and in the Off-Broadway show 'Conflict' at The Producers Club.

She was cast in the award-winning indie film Folklore upon moving to LA. She produced, wrote and starred in the film Duality which is voiced by Deepak Chopra and also stars Jon Foo and Don Most. Duality was an Official Selection of the Hollyshorts Film Festival in 2015. She also produced and starred in the 1940s noir short Unsolved, Directed by Julia Camara. She appeared in the film Game of Aces as British Nurse, Patricia Evans. The film was directed by Damien Lay and stars Chris Klein.

She voiced the character of The Mother in the English dub of the animated film I Lost My Body which was nominated for an Academy Award in 2020. The film was Directed by Jérémy Clapin and the main character Naoufel was voiced by English Actor Dev Patel The film also was nominated for and won several other major awards including an Annie Award and a César Award.

Filmography

Acting Roles

Films Directed

References

External links
SarahLynnDawson.com

Living people
1983 births
English film actresses
American film actresses
American people of English descent
21st-century English actresses
21st-century American actresses